Rubinići is a village in the municipalities of Han Pijesak (Republika Srpska) and Olovo, Bosnia and Herzegovina.

Demographics 
According to the 2013 census, its population was 27, all Bosniaks living in the Han Pijesak part with no one living in the Olovo part.

References

Populated places in Han Pijesak
Populated places in Olovo